Lucas Queiroz Canteiro (born 3 October 2000), known as Luquinha, is a Brazilian professional footballer who plays as a midfielder for Portimonense.

Professional career
On 30 June 2019, Luquinha joined Portimonense in the Portuguese Primeira Liga. Luquinha made his professional debut with Portimonense in a 1-0 Primeira Liga loss to C.D. Tondela on 1 February 2020.

References

External links
 

2000 births
Living people
Sportspeople from Paraná (state)
Brazilian footballers
Portimonense S.C. players
Londrina Esporte Clube players
Primeira Liga players
Association football midfielders
Brazilian expatriate footballers
Expatriate footballers in Portugal